Kenneth G. Davey, OC, FRSC is a Canadian biologist, specifically in insects, currently a Distinguished Research Professor Emeritus at York University. As a known figure in his field, he was a Co-Editor at the NRC Research Press journal Canadian Journal of Zoology.

In 1987, Davey was awarded the Fry Medal.

References

Year of birth missing (living people)
Living people
Academic staff of York University
20th-century Canadian zoologists
Officers of the Order of Canada
Presidents of the Canadian Society of Zoologists